Paranoid Earthling is a Sri Lankan rebel rock band active since 2001. Its music can be described as a blend of experimental rock, grunge, psychedelic and stoner rock. Founded by Mirshad Buckman (lyricist, vocalist and guitarist), the band underwent several line-up changes and at present consists of Harshan Gallage (drummer), Riyal Riffai (bass guitarist) and Kasun Nawarathne (guitarist). The band's EP Rock 'N Roll is My Anarchy was released in 2005.

Origins
A brain child of Mirshad Buckman and Shanka Samarasinghe: inspired to form a band after meeting in school and sharing similar interests in music, the band was put together with Asela Bandara and Dhanushka Samarasinghe as the original line-up. Asela Bandara named the band Paranoid Earthling.

Appearing for a guest performance at a local college concert in late 2001, the band covered Nirvana which caught the attention of the youngsters and made a major breakthrough in the rock culture of Sri Lanka. They have since appeared at numerous concerts with a few international tours.

Paranoid Earthling has been performing in various cities in Sri Lanka since 2001 becoming a hot pick to headline at numerous local gigs and have been invited to represent the country at several international gigs.
Paranoid Earthling questions the status quo through their anarchic anthems that are composed around themes of world peace, freedom of speech, ending impunity, minority oppression, dictatorship, and expressing the angst of youth that grew up through the Sri Lankan Civil War that lasted 30 years.

In 2009 the band embarked on a tour in India performing in cities of New Delhi, Bangalore, and Chennai and in the same year returned to New Delhi to represent Sri Lanka at the SAARC Band Festival

Moreover, Paranoid Earthling performed at the 2012 Sound Central Festival held in Kabul, Afghanistan, becoming the only rock band from Sri Lanka to perform there.

In 2016 the band was invited to perform at ‘Nations for Peace’ held in Gurgaon India, which brought seven bands from six South Asian countries to reiterate the importance of maintaining regional peace. 
Paranoid Earthling has released many EPs following the release of their debut EP titled ‘Rock N Roll is My Anarchy’ in 2005. Their video ‘Bringing Down the Sun’ released for the International World Peace Day amidst the Civil War in 2008 was premiered on local TV and was nominated for the State Media Awards.

The Logo

The band's logo was created by Mirshad Buckman and depicts of an earthling emerging from two merged mohawk heads.

Releases
Rock 'N Roll is My Anarchy – EP 2005
Play Time Music Bootleg – EP 2008
"Bringing Down The Sun" – music video released for the World Peace Day in 2008 produced by Young Asia Television (YATV)
Ministry of Junk – EP 2010
Reign bootleg single released on 28 May 2011
Deaf Blind Dumb single released on 30 April 2014
Half Cast single released on 12 May 2016
Reign official audio single released on all direct streaming platforms 08 August 2022

Major appearances
17–25 September 2009: Hard Rock Cafe – New Delhi, India; Kyra Theater – Bangalore, India; Turquoise Cottage – New Delhi, India; Flame le Club, Le Royal Meridian Hotel – Chennai, India;
12 December 2009: the band performed at the South Asian Band Festival held in Purana Qila, New Delhi, to a crowd of 10,000, followed by a second performance in Chennai, India.
19 December 2009: the band opened for As I Lay Dying and Nervecell from Dubai at the Vihara Maha Devi, Open Air Theater in Colombo, Sri Lanka.
12 April 2022: performed as a guest act on the fourth day of the People's Uprising Protest 2022 Sri Lankan protests staged at the Agitation Site designated by Government of Sri Lanka,

Equipment
The sound of Paranoid Earthling and its signature melodies have been best amplified through Marshall Amplification except that each band member has a pick of his own gear.

References

Sri Lankan musical groups
Sri Lankan rock music groups